Romana Shukhevycha (from 2000 to 2008, Vatutina; from 2008 to 2022, Henerala Vatutina) is a station on the Livoberezhna Line of the Kyiv Light Rail system. It was opened on May 26, 2000 and reopened after a significant modernization of the line on October 26, 2012.

Romana Shukhevycha is located in between the Kashtanova and Troieschyna-2 stations. It was previously named in honor of General Nikolai Vatutin, a Soviet military commander during World War II. On January 4, 2022, it was renamed in honor of Roman Shukhevych, a military leader of the Ukrainian Insurgent Army.

At one point the Kyiv City authorities proposed creating the "Prospekt Vatutina" station of the Kyiv Metro's Livoberezhna Line, although that entire project was scrapped in favor of expanding the existing light rail system.

References

External links
 
 

Kyiv Light Rail stations
Railway stations opened in 2000
2000 establishments in Ukraine